Fragment on the Arab Conquests are fragmentary notes that were written around the year 636 AD on the front blank pages of a sixth-century Syriac Christian manuscript of the Gospel of Mark. The fragment depicts events from the early seventh century conflict between the Byzantines and "the Arabs of Muhammad", particularly of the battle of Yarmouk.

Text
Text in square brackets is conjectured, being unreadable in the original.

Analysis
The fragments are believed to be contemporary to the events of the Arab conquest of the early 7th century. They also provide one of the earlier date for the battle of Yarmuk as having taken place on 20 August 636, assuming Yarmouk is to be identified with the "battle of Gabitha" mentioned in the fragments.

Cook and Crone in Hagarism: The Making of the Islamic World take the fragments to indicate that Muhammad was still alive in 636 at the battle of Yarmouk, contradicting the Muslim accounts of his death.

See also
 Thomas the Presbyter

References

7th-century Christian texts
Arab–Byzantine wars
Muslim conquest of the Levant
636